Euceratocerini is a tribe of death-watch beetles in the family Ptinidae. There are at least 4 genera and about 18 described species in Euceratocerini.

Genera
These four genera belong to the tribe Euceratocerini:
 Actenobius Fall, 1905 i c g b
 Ctenobium LeConte, 1865 i c g b
 Euceratocerus LeConte, 1874 i c g b
 Xeranobium Fall, 1905 i c g b
Data sources: i = ITIS, c = Catalogue of Life, g = GBIF, b = Bugguide.net

References

Further reading

External links

 

Anobiinae